Galanos is a surname. Notable people with the surname include:

Alexis Galanos (born 1940), Greek Cypriot politician
Chris Galanos (born 1982), American Christian pastor
Deborah Galanos, Australian actress
Dimitrios Galanos (1760–1833), Greek Indologist
James Galanos (1924–2016), American fashion designer and couturier
Mike Galanos (born 1964), American news anchor